Anne Carroll  (June 1940 – 15 November 2018) was a British actress and director. In the 2011 New Year Honours, Carroll received an MBE "for services to community theatre in Barnes", as she had run the youth theatre group, Barnes Theatre Company in Barnes, London for two decades. Carroll was the founder of the OSO Arts Centre (Old Sorting Office) arts venue in Barnes.

Filmography
 Bellman and True (1987)
 Amongst Barbarians (1990)
 Coldblooded (1995)

Television
 Dixon of Dock Green (1966)
 Public Eye (1971)
 BBC Television Shakespeare (1981)
 Tales of the Unexpected (1981)

References

External links

1940 births
British actresses
British theatre directors
2018 deaths
Members of the Order of the British Empire